The Gibraltar Falls are a cascade waterfall on the Gibraltar Creek, in the Australian Capital Territory (ACT), approximately  from Canberra's city centre, The falls have a  drop.

Location and features
In Namadgi National Park, the falls are near Corin Road in the Gibraltar Creek Pine Forest. A gravel track from a nearby car park provides access to a lookout to view the falls.  There are a number of walking trails near the falls. Near the falls is a car park, public toilets, and a picnic shelter with a gas barbecue.

The falls have a  drop.

There is not much drainage on Gibraltar Falls, though water will still fall from the falls during drought conditions. 
Three Glossy Black-Cockatoos were spotted at the falls in November 2000. These birds are not frequently found in the territory.

The falls were depicted in the 1966 oil painting titled Rescue at Gibraltar Falls, by John Perceval, with Australian National University landscape architect serving as a model for the figure found in the painting. Bushwalks used to take place to get to the falls. The Australian Heritage Commission commissioned a report on the falls called "An archaeological investigation of the Gibraltar Falls recreation area, A.C.T." Axe grinding grooves have been found at the falls.

Fauna and Flora
The falls is a habitat of the ACT rare Austral pillwort, a fern with thread-like leaves, and the vulnerable Alpine Redspot Dragonfly.

Gibraltar Falls / Woods Reserve Area
The falls is part of the Gilbralter Falls / Woods Reserve Area that is listed on the Register of the National Estate and the ACT National Heritage of Australia list. It is about 170ha in area and is located about  West North-west of Tharwa.

Incidents 
In 2023 a 19-year-old died after falling off the cliffs and into the water.

See also

 List of waterfalls of Australia

References

External links

Waterfalls of the Australian Capital Territory
Landforms of the Australian Capital Territory
Cascade waterfalls